Brian Browne (March 16, 1937 – June 5, 2018) was a Canadian jazz pianist and composer.

Born in Montreal, Quebec, Browne moved to Ottawa as a teenager and was playing professionally by the age of eighteen. Though largely self-taught, Browne attended the Berklee School of Music in Boston, Massachusetts and later studied with Oscar Peterson at Peterson's Advanced School of Contemporary Music in Toronto.

Browne rose to prominence in the Canadian jazz scene in the early 1960s, performing in popular jazz venues in Ottawa and Toronto, and appearing in national weekly CBC Radio programs Adventures in Rhythm, The Browne Beat, Nightcap, Jazz Canada and others. 

His group, the Brian Browne Trio, performed as the house band on the CTV musical variety program The River Inn. In 1969 Browne appeared as one of four featured pianists, including Bill Evans, Erroll Garner and Marian McPartland, on the CBC television special The Jazz Piano. 

He recorded with Canadian singer Anne Murray on her albums This Way is My Way and Honey, Wheat and Laughter and appeared on her subsequent CBC television special. His original piece "Morning, Noon and Nighttime, too" was awarded BMI Song of the Year in 1971. The Brian Browne Trio has included other notable Canadian musicians Skip Beckwith, Donald Vickery, Paul Novotny, Barry Elmes, Michel Donato, and Archie Alleyne.

Browne has recorded 11 albums on Capitol Records, RCA Victor, CBC JazzImage, and Sea Jam Recordings (now Triplet Records). He died of lung and tracheal cancer on June 5, 2018.

Discography

References

1937 births
2018 deaths
Musicians from Montreal
Berklee College of Music alumni
Canadian jazz pianists
Deaths from lung cancer
Deaths from cancer in Ontario